Bactrosphaeria is a genus of fungi within the class Sordariomycetes. The relationship of this taxon to other taxa within the class is unknown (incertae sedis). A monotypic genus, Bactrosphaeria contains the single species Bactrosphaeria asterostoma.

References

Sordariomycetes enigmatic taxa
Monotypic Sordariomycetes genera